Tor Ingar Jakobsen (born August 15, 1973) is a Norwegian composer and musician. He is mostly known for his work in the musical theatre. Jakobsen is the composer for the family musical The Time of Nick, which had its Broadway presentation in New York City, September 2017  He is also the composer for the NYC based musical Under Her Hat and he has composed the music for the children musical Den Magiske Julekrystallen Another of his musicals is 'Jakten på Bene Skinnkniv.

Jakobsen was born in Gjøvik, Norway, and started taking piano lessons at the age of 6. At the age of 15 he started doing his first professional jobs as a musician. In his teens he started to play in different bands, including rock bands, cover bands and jazz bands. Along with the work at the concert scene, this was also the time when he started doing his first jobs as musical director in different local theatre productions.

In 2004 he was educated from the University of Oslo as cand.philol. in jazz piano and composing.

Jakobsen lives in Oslo and works as a composer, piano player, arranger and musical director.

References

1973 births
Living people
Norwegian composers
Norwegian male composers
University of Oslo alumni
Musicians from Gjøvik